Tandem Productions is a Munich-based company which produces television film, miniseries, television series and film series.

It was founded in 1999 by Emmy-nominated producers Rola Bauer and Tim Halkin.

In 2012, StudioCanal acquired Tandem.

Produced
 Relic Hunter (in association with) (1999)
 Final Run (in association with) (1999)
 Frank Herbert's Dune (in collaboration with) (2000)
 The Lost Future (2010)
 The Pillars of the Earth (2010)
 World Without End (2012)
 Labyrinth (2012)
 Crossing Lines (2013)
 Take Two (2018)
 Saturday Afternoon (2019)

References

External links
 

Television production companies of Germany
Mass media in Munich
StudioCanal